Christie Cleek (or -Cleek or of-the-Cleek) is a legendary Scottish cannibal, somewhat in the vein of the better-known Sawney Bean.

Folklore
According to folklore, his real name was Andrew Christie, a Perth butcher. During a severe famine in the mid-fourteenth century (Hector Boece records floods, murrain, and plagues of "myce and ratonis" throughout Scotland in 1340), Christie joined a group of scavengers in the foothills of the Grampians. When one of the party died of starvation, Christie put his butcher skills to work on the corpse and provided his companions with a ready meal.

The group developed a taste for human flesh as, under Christie's leadership, they began to ambush travellers in the passes of the Grampians, feeding on their bodies and those of their horses. It is alleged that before attacking, Christie would haul his victims from their mounts with a hook on a rod: this implement was the "cleke" (i.e., "crook") from which he took his sobriquet. Thirty riders apparently died at Christie's hands.

Eventually, the company was defeated by an armed force from Perth except for Christie himself who supposedly escaped and re-entered society under a new name. 

The earliest versions of this narrative are much less detailed, recording only Christie's cannibalism and his methods of trapping prey. No mention is made of his accomplices or eventual fate.

Cheviot's Proverbs (1896) mentions some folklore about the character, who came to be known as a bugbear or bogeyman:

Comparison with Sawney Bean
The parallels between Christie and Sawney Bean are obvious and insistent. One story may well have given rise to the other, or both may have been derived from a common source.

While Bean far exceeds his counterpart in terms of notoriety, the Christie legend does appear to be older. Tales of the Bean family do not appear before the 18th century, but Christie's exploits are documented from the 15th century onwards. For instance, Andrew of Wyntoun's Orygynale Cronykil of Scotland (c. 1420) refers to a figure called "Chwsten Cleek" who, during a time of "sae great default...that mony were in hunger dead', set up traps with the intent 'children and women for to slay,/ And swains that he might over-ta;/ And ate them all that he get might". A little later, in an entry for 1341, Holinshed's Chronicles (c.1577) reports:

See also
 The Jarmans of Colnbrook
Sweeney Todd

References
 Raphael Holinshed, The first and second volumes of Chronicles comprising 1 The description and history of England, 2 The description and history of Ireland, 3 The description and history of Scotland (London: Henry Denham, 1587)
 John Mackay Wilson, Tales Of The Borders, And Of Scotland (Edinburgh: James Gemmell, 1883)
 Andrew of Wyntoun, The Original Chronicle, ed. by F.J. Amours, 6 vols, Scottish Text Society 63 (Edinburgh: William Blackwood for The Scottish Text Society, 1908–14)

Bogeymen
Fictional characters introduced in the 15th century
Scottish butchers
Scottish cannibals
Scottish criminals
Scottish folklore
Scottish serial killers
Legendary Scottish people
Male serial killers
People from Perth, Scotland